A Regimentarz (from Latin: regimentum) was a military commander in Poland, since the 16th century, of an army group or a substitute of  a Hetman. He was nominated by the King of Poland or the Sejm.

In the 17th century a Regimentarz was also the commander of Pospolite ruszenie in cases where a castellan or a voivode could not command personally.

Regimentarz generalny was the commander of Confederations.

See also
 Offices in Polish-Lithuanian Commonwealth

Polish titles
Military ranks of Poland